Kelly's Westport Inn is a historical bar in Westport, Kansas City, Missouri, constructed around 1850. Kelly's and the adjoining Chouteau Store are considered to be the oldest buildings still standing in Kansas City.

History
The grandson of Daniel Boone, Albert Gallatin Boone, operated a grocery store. A story about the Underground Railroad alleges that a southbound tunnel connects to a stable which is now also a bar called the Westport Saloon.

Around 1900, the Wiedenmann family operated a grocery there, which catered to Kansas City's elite.  With the repeal of Prohibition, Phil Taggart rented the building and opened a saloon named the Wrestlers Inn.  A few years later, Randal Kelly, born in County Clare, Ireland, became a bartender.  He soon became a partner.

In 1959, the building was designated a national historic landmark.

In 1969, Kelly's Inn was registered as a historic building. The tunnel only connects two basements and there was no Underground Railroad association.

In 1996, Kansas City native Eddie Griffin used Kelly's as the inspiration for the setting of his sitcom Malcolm & Eddie, starring himself and Malcolm-Jamal Warner.

See also
List of the oldest buildings in Missouri

External links

References

Drinking establishments in Missouri
Buildings and structures in Kansas City, Missouri
Commercial buildings completed in 1850
Tourist attractions in Kansas City, Missouri
Commercial buildings on the National Register of Historic Places in Missouri
National Register of Historic Places in Kansas City, Missouri
Drinking establishments on the National Register of Historic Places